Herman's myotis (Myotis hermani) is a species of vesper bat. It is found only in Indonesia.

References

Mouse-eared bats
Taxonomy articles created by Polbot
Taxa named by Oldfield Thomas
Mammals described in 1923
Bats of Southeast Asia